Tsatanikh is a rural locality (a selo) in Untsukulsky District, Republic of Dagestan, Russia. The population was 862 as of 2010. There are 5 streets.

Geography 
Tsatanikh is located 33 km west of Shamilkala (the district's administrative centre) by road. Ishtiburi is the nearest rural locality.

References 

Rural localities in Untsukulsky District